Bernardina Adriana Schramm (1900–1987) was a notable New Zealand pianist and music teacher. She was born in Rotterdam, Netherlands in 1900.

References

1900 births
1987 deaths
New Zealand pianists
New Zealand women pianists
New Zealand music teachers
Musicians from Rotterdam
Dutch emigrants to New Zealand
20th-century pianists
Women music educators
20th-century women pianists